The Double Helix Medal has been awarded annually since 2006 by Cold Spring Harbor Laboratory (CSHL) to individuals who have positively impacted human health by raising awareness and funds for biomedical research. At the inaugural dinner, Muhammad Ali received the first Double Helix Medal for his fight against Parkinson's disease. Other notable recipients include founders of Autism Speaks Suzanne and Bob Wright; former Paramount Pictures head Sherry Lansing who produced the Stand Up to Cancer telethon; Evelyn Lauder who founded the Breast Cancer Research Foundation; Hank Greenberg of the Starr Foundation, which is one of the largest supporters of scientific research; Marilyn and Jim Simons, the world's largest individual supporters of autism research; David H. Koch who has donated over $300 million to biomedical research; and prominent scientists and Nobel laureates.

The Double Helix Medal is named for the iconic structure of the DNA molecule, discovered by James D. Watson, Francis Crick, Maurice Wilkins, and Rosalind Franklin. The study of DNA is central to biological research, and is at the heart of work at CSHL.

The annual New York City gala at which the medals are awarded was sparked by philanthropist Cathy Cyphers Soref, an Honorary Director of the Cold Spring Harbor Laboratory Association.

Medal recipients
2022:
 Albert Bourla, Ph.D.
 Jennifer Doudna, Ph.D.

2021:
 Reggie Jackson
 Leonard S. Schleifer, M.D., Ph.D.
 George D. Yancopoulos, M.D., Ph.D.

2020:

2019:
 Boomer Esiason
 Nancy Wexler, Ph.D.

2018:/
 Priscilla Chan and Mark Zuckerberg
 Larry Norton, M.D.

2017:
 Tom Brokaw
 Helen & Charles Dolan

2016:
 Alan Alda
 P. Roy Vagelos

2015:
 David Botstein
 Katie Couric
 Anne Wojcicki

2014:
 Andrew Solomon
 Matthew Meselson
 Marlo Thomas

November 4, 2013:
 Peter Neufeld
 Robin Roberts
 Barry C. Scheck

November 28, 2012:
 Michael J. Fox
 Arthur D. Levinson
 Mary D. Lindsay

November 15, 2011:
 Kareem Abdul-Jabbar
 Temple Grandin
 Harold E. Varmus

November 9, 2010:
 Mary-Claire King
 Evelyn Lauder
 John F. Nash, Jr.

November 10, 2009:
 Herbert W. Boyer
 Stanley N. Cohen
 Kathryn W. Davis
 Maurice Greenberg

November 6, 2008:
 Sherry Lansing
 Marilyn and James Simons
 James D. Watson
 J. Craig Venter

November 8, 2007:
 David Koch
 Michael Wigler
 Richard Axel

November 9, 2006:
 Muhammad Ali
 Suzanne Wright
 Bob Wright
 Phillip Sharp

References

External links
 Double Helix Medal home
 Double Helix Medal history
 2010 Double Helix Medal dinner at New York Social Diary
 2007 Double Helix Medal dinner at New York Social Diary
 2006 Double Helix Medal dinner at New York Social Diary
 Cold Spring Harbor Laboratory 2008 Double Helix Medals Dinner, New York | People & Parties With Panache
 Double Helix Medals Dinner
 CSHL Moving Forward with New Faculty Hires Despite Weak Economy
 Cold Spring Harbor Laboratory's Double Helix Medal Dinner

Awards established in 2006